In enzymology, a phosphoribosylaminoimidazolecarboxamide formyltransferase, also known by the shorter name AICAR transformylase, is an enzyme that catalyzes the chemical reaction

10-formyltetrahydrofolate + AICAR  tetrahydrofolate + FAICAR

Thus, the two substrates of this enzyme are 10-formyltetrahydrofolate and AICAR, whereas its two products are tetrahydrofolate and FAICAR.

This enzyme participates in purine metabolism and one carbon pool by folate.

Nomenclature 

This enzyme belongs to the family of transferases that transfer one-carbon groups, specifically the hydroxymethyl-, formyl- and related transferases. The systematic name of this enzyme class is 10-formyltetrahydrofolate:5-phosphoribosyl-5-amino-4-imidazole-carb oxamide N-formyltransferase. Other names in common use include:

 10-formyltetrahydrofolate:5-phosphoribosyl-5-amino-4-imidazolecarboxamide formyltransferase
 5-amino-1-ribosyl-4-imidazolecarboxamide 5-phosphate,
 5-amino-4-imidazolecarboxamide ribonucleotide transformylase,
 5-amino-4-imidazolecarboxamide ribotide transformylase,
 5-phosphoribosyl-5-amino-4-imidazolecarboxamide formyltransferase,
 AICAR formyltransferase,
 AICAR transformylase,
 aminoimidazolecarboxamide ribonucleotide transformylase, and
 transformylase,
 bifunctional purine biosynthesis protein PURH,
 ATIC.

Structural studies

References

 

EC 2.1.2
Enzymes of known structure